The 1839 Alabama gubernatorial election was an election held on August 3, 1839, to elect the governor of Alabama. Incumbent Democratic Governor Arthur P. Bagby defeated Whig candidate Arthur F. Hopkins with 92.29% of the vote.

General election

Candidates
Arthur P. Bagby, incumbent governor
Arthur F. Hopkins, former Alabama Supreme Court Chief Justice (1836–1837)

Results

References

Alabama gubernatorial elections
Alabama
1839 Alabama elections
August 1839 events